The 1984 NFL Supplemental Draft of USFL and CFL players was a one-time draft of United States Football League and Canadian Football League players, held in the spring of 1984.

Reason for the draft
In New York City on Tuesday, June 5,  starting at 10 am EDT, the National Football League held a draft for college seniors who had already signed with either the USFL or the CFL in an attempt to head off a bidding war in its own ranks for USFL and CFL players. The 28 NFL teams chose 84 players from 224 available during the three-round selection meeting. The draft was for players who would have been eligible for the regular 1984 NFL Draft in early May, but  had already signed a contract with  a  USFL or CFL team.

The draft was implemented primarily with the fledgling USFL in mind. The owners did not want to risk potentially "wasting" picks in the regular draft on players who were already signed by another league, but also wanted to ensure there would not be a large influx of free agent talent in case the new league suddenly collapsed. The CFL, being a much more established circuit with strict limits on the number of American players on each team, was not as much of a concern, but was included to shield the NFL from potential antitrust litigation that might have arisen had the league targeted a specific rival with a supplemental draft. Of the 84 players selected, only eight were from the CFL, with 76 from the USFL.

The Los Angeles Express were something less than a juggernaut in 1984, with only a 8–7 record at the time of this draft. They finished 10–8 in the regular season and lost in the second round (semifinals) of the eight-team playoffs. But their talent-laden roster, including future Hall of Famers Steve Young and Gary Zimmerman, proved popular as twenty Express players were picked, including four of the first six selections and eleven in the opening round. (The eventual '84 USFL champs from Philadelphia were second with nine picks; no CFL team had more than two.)

Only one trade involving supplemental draft picks was consummated, as the Cleveland Browns acquired all three of the Chicago Bears' supplemental picks in exchange for the Browns' selections in the final four rounds of the regular 1984 draft. As a result, Cleveland made six selections in this draft (including Pro Bowlers Kevin Mack and Gerald McNeil, both with picks that originally belonged to Chicago) while the Bears made none. The other 26 teams made three selections each.

First round
{|class="wikitable sortable sortable" style="width: 100%"
|-
!style="background:#A8BDEC;" width=7%|Pick # !!width=25% style="background:#A8BDEC;"|NFL Team !!width=15% style="background:#A8BDEC;"|Player !!width=7% style="background:#A8BDEC;"|Position !!width=20% style="background:#A8BDEC;"|Pro Team !!width=20% style="background:#A8BDEC;"|College
|-
|align=center|1||Tampa Bay Buccaneers ||bgcolor="#CCFFCC"|Steve Young||align=center|QB ||Los Angeles Express|| BYU
|-
|align=center|2||Houston Oilers||bgcolor="#FFCC00"| Mike Rozier||align=center|RB ||Pittsburgh Maulers||Nebraska
|-
|align=center|3||New York Giants|| bgcolor="#CCFFCC"|Gary Zimmerman||align=center|G ||Los Angeles Express||Oregon
|-
|align=center|4||Philadelphia Eagles||bgcolor="#CCFFCC"| Reggie White||align=center|DE ||Memphis Showboats||Tennessee
|-
|align=center|5||Kansas City Chiefs|| Mark Adickes||align=center|OT|| Los Angeles Express||Baylor
|-
|align=center|6||San Diego Chargers||bgcolor="#FFCC00"| Lee Williams||align=center|DE || Los Angeles Express||Bethune–Cookman
|-
|align=center|7||Cincinnati Bengals|| Wayne Peace||align=center|QB ||Tampa Bay Bandits||Florida
|-
|align=center|8||Indianapolis Colts|| Paul Bergmann ||align=center|TE ||Jacksonville Bulls||UCLA
|-
|align=center|9||Atlanta Falcons ||Joey Jones||align=center|WR ||Birmingham Stallions|| Alabama
|-
|align=center|10||New York Jets|| Ken Hobart||align=center|QB|| Denver Gold|| Idaho
|-
|align=center|11||Cleveland Browns(from Chicago Bears) ||bgcolor="#FFCC00"| Kevin Mack ||align=center|FB|| Los Angeles Express|| Clemson
|-
|align=center|12||Green Bay Packers|| Buford Jordan||align=center|RB || New Orleans Breakers|| McNeese State
|-
|align=center|13||Minnesota Vikings ||Allanda Smith||align=center|CB ||Los Angeles Express ||TCU
|-
|align=center|14||Buffalo Bills ||Dwight Drane||align=center|S ||Los Angeles Express || Oklahoma
|-
|align=center|15||New Orleans Saints||bgcolor="#FFCC00"| Vaughan Johnson||align=center|LB|| Jacksonville Bulls|| North Carolina State
|-
|align=center|16||New England Patriots|| Ricky Sanders||align=center|WR ||Houston Gamblers||Southwest Texas State
|-
|align=center|17||St. Louis Cardinals ||Mike Ruether||align=center|C ||Los Angeles Express||Texas
|-
|align=center|18||Cleveland Browns||bgcolor="#FFCC00"| Mike Johnson ||align=center|LB|| Philadelphia Stars ||Virginia Tech
|-
|align=center|19||Denver Broncos|| Freddie Gilbert||align=center|DE|| New Jersey Generals ||Georgia
|-
|align=center|20||Detroit Lions|| Alphonso Williams||align=center|WR|| Oklahoma Outlaws ||Nevada-Reno
|-
|align=center|21||Los Angeles Rams||bgcolor="#FFCC00"| William Fuller ||align=center|DE || Philadelphia Stars ||North Carolina
|-
|align=center|22||Seattle Seahawks|| Gordon Hudson ||align=center|TE ||Los Angeles Express ||BYU
|-
|align=center|23||Pittsburgh Steelers|| Duane Gunn ||align=center|WR ||Los Angeles Express ||Indiana
|-
|align=center|24||San Francisco 49ers|| Derrick Crawford||align=center|WR|| Memphis Showboats || Memphis State
|-
|align=center|25||Dallas Cowboys|| Todd Fowler||align=center|TE-RB|| Houston Gamblers ||Stephen F. Austin
|-
|align=center|26||Miami Dolphins|| Danny Knight||align=center|WR|| New Jersey Generals || Mississippi State
|-
|align=center|27||Washington Redskins|| Tony Zendejas ||align=center|K ||Los Angeles Express ||Nevada-Reno
|-
|align=center|28||Los Angeles Raiders|| Christopher Woods||align=center|WR ||Edmonton Eskimos (CFL) ||Auburn
|}

Second round

Third round

Selections by teams

Hall of Famers
 Steve Young, quarterback from the USFL, taken first overall by the Tampa Bay Buccaneers. 
Pro Football Hall of Fame, Class of 2005

 Gary Zimmerman, offensive tackle from the USFL, taken third overall by the New York Giants.
Pro Football Hall of Fame, Class of 2008

 Reggie White, defensive end from the USFL, taken fourth overall by the Philadelphia Eagles. 
Pro Football Hall of Fame, Class of 2006

See also
1984 USFL Draft
1984 USFL Territorial Draft

References

1984 NFL Supplemental Draft of USFL and CFL Players
profootballhof.com 

National Football League Draft
Supplemental Draft of USFL and CFL Players